Harry Van Buren Richardson (June 27, 1901 – December 13, 1990) was a theologian, writer, and the first president of the Interdenominational Theological Center.

Education
Richardson began his college training from Western Reserve University where he received an A.B., and later matriculated to Harvard University where he received a S.T.B. from the Divinity School. While at Harvard, he was awarded the university's two highest honors. In 1945, Richardson received his PhD from Drew University in rural sociology and religion.

Published works
 1947: Dark Glory: A Picture of the Church among Negroes in the Rural South
 1976: Dark Salvation: The Story of Methodism as It Developed among Blacks in America
 1981: Walk Together, Children: The Story of the Birth and Growth of the Interdenominational Theological Center

References

External links

Dr. Harry V. Richardson speaking into a dictaphone(1955) at the ITC
Selma T. and Harry V. Richardson Ecumenical Fellowship
Letter from Harry V. Richardson to W. E. B. Du Bois, April 22, 1940
"Why I Believe There is a God", Ebony, October 1962
Spreading the Word: Expanding Access to African American Religious Archival Collections at the Atlanta University Center Robert W. Woodruff Library

1901 births
1990 deaths
American theologians
African-American educators
Case Western Reserve University alumni
Harvard Divinity School alumni
Drew University alumni
20th-century African-American people